CapitaGreen, also known as Market Street Tower, is an office tower located in Raffles Place, Singapore. The building was designed by Toyo Ito and completed in 2014.

Architecture
The CapitaGreen building was designed to be "like a plant growing towards the sun", with a façade that incorporates living plants. The rooftop garden, known as the "Sky Forest", has 40 different kinds of tree and shrub. The rooftop garden features a 45m-high (150ft) windcatcher structure, designed to look like flower petals, that captures cool fresh air and channels it into the office floors.

Awards
CapitaGreen won the 2015 CTBUH Skyscraper Award for Best Tall Building in the Asia and Australasia Region.

See also
 List of tallest buildings in Singapore

References 

CapitaLand
Skyscraper office buildings in Singapore
Office buildings completed in 2014
2014 establishments in Singapore